Inglis Island is an island of the Andaman Islands. It belongs to the South Andaman administrative district, part of the Indian union territory of Andaman and Nicobar Islands.

Etymology
Inglis island is named after Major-general Sir John Eardley Wilmot Inglis.

Geography
The island belongs to the Ritchie's Archipelago and is located west of John Lawrence Island.
Chain Nalah point is a popular tourist beach located on the island's west coast. it has some picnic tables on it.

Administration
Politically, Inglis Island is part of Port Blair Taluk.

Demographics 
The island is uninhabited.

Image gallery

References 

Ritchie's Archipelago
Islands of South Andaman district
Islands of the Andaman Sea
Uninhabited islands of India